Odhra also spelled as Odrah is a village in the Dasuya (Dasua) subdivision of the Hoshiarpur district in Punjab, India. Other names for Odhra are Ond, Odhran and Odrysian.

Geography
It has an average elevation of 240 metres (787 feet) from sea level. The village has 108 hectares of area with 128 households. The village has 0% forest coverage and 1% wasteland used for discarding household waste and animal carcasses. Water bodies cover 0.5% of the total land and comprise a natural pond, canal, and seasonal rivulet. The total population of Odhra is 600 people with an equal number of males and females. There are 12 % of people under the age of 6 with 53% males and 47% females. The total scheduled caste population is 507 (85%) and the gender ratio is 49% males vs 51% females. Total literates in the village are 79% (82% males and 76% females). In Odhra 5% of the population is below the poverty line according to Indian government guidelines.

Location
Odhra is located on the subdivision road which connects Dasuya with Himachal Pradesh via Kamahi Devi. It is located in the district Hoshiarpur of Punjab state in India.  The village is well connected with Dasuya, Jhalota, Bagalipur, Terkiana, Balgan by metaled roads. Dasuya is connected with rail, and highways with the rest of India.  Major cities in the vicinity of Odhra are Hoshiarpur (46 km), Jalandhar (58 km), Gurdaspur (42 km), Amritsar (93 km) and Pathankot (58 km).  State highways running through Dasuya connect Hoshiarpur, Talwara, and Hajipur to the town.  Other connecting roads link Dasuya with Amritsar through Shri Hargovindpur, Daulatpur through Kamahi Devi, and Kapurthala through Miani and Begowal.  The Holy Shrine of Mata Chintpurni (Chinnmastika) can also be reached via Hajipur-Talwara or Kamahi Devi route. A major rivulet (Langarpur Odhra choe) runs through Odhra which is a seasonal tributary of the river Beas.

History
Ond/ Odhra/ Odhran/Odrysian are considered branches of Andhaka clan.  The Puranas mention them as "Śakānodhrāna", i.e., Saka Odhran. The clan is also mentioned in Sabha Parva of Mahabharata (Mahabharata: Ch 47) as well as Vishnu Purana. Their first ancestor was Odra, and his descendants are called Odhran.

In Bhagavata Purana, Bali, the King of in succession line is mentioned to have six sons Anga, Banga, Kalinga, Sambhu, Pundra, and Odhra. 

During Alexander's invasion, Odhra was also mentioned in his biography. Arrian(Arrian Anabasis Book/3a, Ch.6,fn 3(12)) states, ..."Next stood the Odrysian cavalry, under the command of Agatho, son of Tyrimmas. In this part, in front of all, were posted the auxiliary cavalry of the Grecian mercenaries, under the direction of Andromachus, son of Hiero. Near the baggage, the infantry from Thrace was posted as a guard."

Modern History
The village was inhabited by Sikhs and Muslims before 1947. After partition, the Muslim population migrated to Pakistan, and Sikhs remained in the village. There are ruins of water wells and buildings in the village. Muslims from Odhra were moved to Military Camp in Dasuya and boarded on trains from Jalandhar to the Atari border.

Transport
There are regular, round the clock bus services from Delhi via Hoshiarpur or Jalandhar, Chandigarh, Jammu, Pathankot, Amritsar, Ambala, Ludhiana, Ferozpur, Faridkot, Moga, Hissar, Kapurthala, Shimla, Haridwar, Jaipur and other major cities of North India operated by Punjab Roadways, PEPSU, Haryana Roadways, CTU, Delhi Transport Corporation, Himachal Parivahan Nigam, J&K SRTC, Rajasthan Roadways and UP Roadways apart from several private operators to Dasuya. From Dasuya one can catch local transport, cycle rickshaw, autos or buses (Hoshiarpur road) to reach Odhra.

Dasuya railway station is well connected with all parts of India and is the busiest station in the Hoshiarpur district. Trains towards Kanyakumari, Chennai, Thiruvananthapuram, Mangalore, Mumbai, Guwahati, Kolkota, Indore, Delhi, Patna, Jaipur, Ahmadabad, Lucknow, Kanpur, Haridwar, Ambala, Amritsar, Jalandhar, Pathankot, Katra, Udhampur, and Jammu passes through Dasuya.

Airports near Odhra are in Pathankot (Deccan air service to Delhi and Kangra, Air India to Delhi via Ludhiana), Raja Sansi International Airport (UK, Canada, Singapore, middle east, central Asia, Slovenia and rest of India), Ludhiana (domestic), Chandigarh (domestic) and Mohali (international).  The nearest helipad is in Uchi Bassi but temporary arrangements are done in the city stadium.

Economy
Agriculture is the main income source for Odhra. Fields spread from Dasuya to Bagalipur and Saglan to Jhalota. The lone canal from the Bhakra Beas project was constructed in 1990 towards the northern end but is now lying useless due to the lack of repair. The majority of youth from Odhra have served or are serving in the Indian Armed forces (Air force, Army, Navy, and paramilitary services). Foreign remittance is received by a few families. Since independence Odhra is known for its brick kilns. Bricks for construction are supplied throughout Punjab and Himachal region from Odhra.

Education
A primary school run by Punjab Government was located on the west side of the village. However, this was shut down by the Punjab government. Permission to restarted the school was guaranteed in 2021. Students from the village attend schools at Panwan, Jhalota, Balgan, and Dasuya for higher studies. Residents and natives of Odhra are working as engineers, media persons, TV anchors, doctors, professors, banking officers, businessmen, and civil servants in the Punjab government. At this moment, Odhraites have migrated to Australia, Canada, UK, USA, Italy, Ireland, Spain, Oman, UAE, Qatar, New Zealand, and Saudi Arabia for education, work, or permanent basis.

Administration
A village panchayat governs Odhra. It consists of democratically elected sarpanch (head) and five  (members). Apart from these members village has several socially and politically influential members actively working towards the upliftment of society and village.

Development
All main roads of Odhra are metaled and all streets are made up of concrete or bricks. A new gate at the entrance of the village was built after the memory of Baba Ratan Das. The school building was rebuilt and a water tank with clean fresh water was provided to the school. The village has a continuous supply of freshwater provided by the Government of Punjab since 1986. The village still lacks a sewage system or wastewater treatment plant. Pond of Odhra which recharges the water table needs extensive cleaning and desilting. Every household owns modern-day appliances such as color TV, refrigerator, cars, two-wheelers, and LPG stoves. 

During the recent COVID-19 outbreak, Odhra volunteers have shut down the entire village and have guarded all entrances and exits with volunteers.

References

External links
 MC Dasuya
 Dasuya Portal

Villages in Hoshiarpur district